Scott Doney is a marine scientist at the University of Virginia known for his work on biogeochemical modeling. Doney is the Joe D. and Helen J. Kington Professor in Environmental Change, a fellow of the American Geophysical Union, the American Association for the Advancement of Science., and the Association for the Sciences of Limnology and Oceanography. He is currently serving as the Assistant Director for Ocean Climate Science and Policy in the White House Office of Science and Technology Policy.

Education and career 
Doney has a B.A. in chemistry from the University of California at San Diego and earned his Ph.D. in 1991 from the Massachusetts Institute of Technology - Woods Hole Oceanographic Institution Joint Program. He moved to the National Center for Atmospheric Research (NCAR) where he started a postdoctoral fellowship in 1991. In 1993 he joined the science staff at NCAR, and remained there until he moved to the Woods Hole Oceanographic Institution in 2002. In 2017 he moved to the University of Virginia where he is the Joe D. and Helen J. Kington Professor in Environmental Change.

Research 
Doney is known for his use of computational methods including modeling, satellite remote sensing, and data science in the field of oceanography. His work centers on how ecosystems respond to natural and human-induced change through examination of coastal and ocean carbon cycles.

Selected publications

Awards and honors 
 James B. Macelwane Medal, American Geophysical Union (2000)
 Fellow, American Geophysical Union (2000)
 Fellow, Aldo Leopold Leadership Program (2004)
 Fellow, American Association for the Advancement of Science (2010)
 A.G. Huntsman Award for Excellence in Marine Science (2013)
 Fellow, Association for the Sciences of Limnology and Oceanography (2021)

References

External links 
 

Fellows of the American Association for the Advancement of Science
Fellows of the American Geophysical Union
University of California, San Diego alumni
Massachusetts Institute of Technology alumni
University of Virginia faculty
Living people
American climatologists
American oceanographers

Year of birth missing (living people)